A pallavi has multiple connotations in carnatic music. It is the first part of any formal composition (Krithi) which has three segments - Pallavi, Anupallavi and Charanam (which can be one or more). Pallavi is usually also an abbreviation of Ragam Thanam Pallavi.

Other uses
Pallavi in Sanskrit is used as an adjective or a verb with appropriate suffix to denote a small and tender red-coloured leaf of a plant or a tendril.

References

Carnatic music
Carnatic music terminology